Cymindis atrolucens is a species of ground beetle in the subfamily Harpalinae. It was described by Casey in 1913.

References

atrolucens
Beetles described in 1913